This is a list of Macedonian comics creators. Although comics have different formats, this list covers creators of comic books, graphic novels and comic strips, along with early innovators.

The list presents authors with the Republic of Macedonia as their country of work, and does not imply their ethnic origin, which could be Macedonian, as well as Serb, Jewish, Bulgarian, Aromanian or Greek. For other countries, see List of comic creators.

A
 Toni Anastasovski
 Tome Andreevski
 Ivanka Apostolova

B
 Marina Baleva
 Dine Baltakov
 Darko Bogdanov
 Atanas Botev

C
 Goce Cvetanovski
 Smile Cvetanovski
 Zoran Cvetković
 Siniša Cvetkovski - Šiljo

D
 Jordančo Davidovski
 Robert Dandarov
 Goran Dacev
 Goran Dačev - Gorand
 Mihajlo Dimitrievski - The Micho
 Rade Dičoski
 Kiro Donev
 Davor Dramićanin
 Spiro Džajkov
 Tomi Džurovski
 Lasko Džurovski
 Branko Šotra

F
 Ljubomir Filipovski (Ljupčo Filipov)

G
 Nikola Gelevski alias Pandalf Vulkanski
 Zdravko Girov
 Petar Gligorovski
 Miroslav Grčev

I
 Dime Ivanov - Dimano
 Tode Ivanovski
 Ilija Ilievski

J
 Zoran Janevski
 Vlado Janevski
 Slavko Janevski
 Pande Jarevski
 Dukan Jelen
 Ljupčo Jovanov
 Igor Jovčevski
 Ilija Jordanovski

K
 Marjan Kamilovski
 Aco Karamanov
 Živko Kozar
 Dragan Kostić
 Miroslav Kostić
 Igor Kostovski
 Stefan Kocevski - Stef
 Igor Kralevski
 Boro Krstevski
 Zlatko Krstevski
 Vasil Kunovski

L
 Miho Lazarov
 Borko Lazeski

M
 Vlado Maleski
 Jordan Manasijeski
 Slavomir Marinković
 Nikola Marinoski
 Darko Marković
 Blagoja Milevski
 Darko Mitrevski
 Dragan Mitrevski
 Damjan Mihailov
 Delčo Mihajlov
 Miki Mladenov

N
 Rumena Najčevska
 Stevan Nestorovski
 Ivančo Nikolov
 Vlado Nikolovski
 Mile Ničevski

O
 Tomislav Osmanli

P
 Aco Palitov
 Boro Pejčinov
 Dušan Perčinkov
 Toni Pešev
 Boban Pešov
 Lazo Plavevski
 Mirko Popov
 Vasilie Popović Cico
 Aleksandar Popovski
 Ilija Popovski
 Sašo Popovski
 Aleksandar Prokopiev
 Psilo i Ventolina (two girls with pseudonyms)

R
 Darko Ristevski
 Antonio Rusevski

S
 Dragan Sekulić
 Jovančo Sekulovski
 Riste Sekulovski
 Aleksandar Sotirovski
 Ivica Spasovski
 Aleksandar Stankovski
 Ljubomir Stefanov
 Ljubiša Sulimanović

T
 Zoran Tanev
 Slavčo Temkov
 Nikola Temkov
 Mile Topuz
 Igor Toševski
 Kostadin Trajanovski
 Mladen Tunić

U
 Vlada Urošević

V
 Đuro Varga
 Bruno Veljanovski
 Tanja Vukobrat
 Tomo Vladimirski

Z
 Dijano Zdravković

References

Sources
 Tomislav Osmanli, „Razvojot na stripot vo Makedonija – sedum decenii stripovno tvoreštvo“, Strip, zapis so čovečki lik, „Mlad borec“, 1987; „Kultura“, Skopje 2002; Proekt Rastko - Makedonija, 14. 5. 2010.
 Makedonski strip forum: autori
 Živojin Tamburić, Zdravko Zupan i Zoran Stefanović. The Comics We Loved, Selection of 20th Century Comics and Creators from the Region of Former Yugoslavia (Stripovi koje smo voleli: Izbor stripova i stvaralaca sa prostora bivše Jugoslavije u XX veku), „Omnibus“, Beograd, 2011.

Macedonian comics artists
Macedonian comics creators
Macedonian comics creators